Shannon Elizabeth Kane (born September 14, 1985) is an American actress best known for portraying her roles as Traci Madsen on the Nick at Nite series Hollywood Heights (2012) and Natalia Fowler on the ABC daytime soap opera All My Children (2008–2011) and her role as Sabine Laurent / Céleste Dubois in The Originals

Early life
Shannon Elizabeth Kane was born on September 14, 1985 in Kalamazoo, Michigan. Shannon attended Portage Central High School in Portage, Michigan and Western Michigan University.

Career 
Her first on-screen appearance was a guest role as Leslie Anderson in an episode of the police procedural drama series CSI: Miami. Kane had small guest roles on the television shows Entourage (2007) and The Young and the Restless (2007). In 2008, she joined the cast of ABC's daytime soap opera All My Children as Natalia Fowler. Kane appeared in two 2009 films; Brooklyn's Finest and Blood and Bone. She also had roles in films Madea's Big Happy Family (2011), S.W.A.T.: Firefight (2011) and The Collection (2012).

In 2012, she played a successful graphic designer called Traci Madsen in the family drama series Hollywood Heights, which aired on Nick at Nite and TeenNick from June 18 to October 5, 2012. She landed a recurring role as Sabine Laurent, a witch who is possessed by Celeste DuBois, in the first season of The CW's supernatural drama series The Originals. Kane had a recurring role opposite Boris Kodjoe in three episodes on the final season of CBS’ medical drama series Code Black. In October 2018, Deadline reported that Kane had joined the cast of BET's musical drama series American Soul, portraying attorney Ilsa Dejarnette. She appeared in four episodes on the first season of American Soul.

She portrayed Sam in five episodes of the mini drama series Terror Lake Drive in 2020. Terror Lake Drive is a six-part series that follows a single mother who moves to Atlanta in an attempt to avoid her troubled past.

Personal life 
Kane has a son named Zion.

Filmography

Film

Television

References

External links

African-American actresses
American soap opera actresses
American television actresses
Living people
Participants in American reality television series
1985 births
21st-century African-American people
21st-century African-American women
20th-century African-American people
20th-century African-American women